Jiří Konopásek (born 16 April 1946) is a Czech former basketball player and coach.

Club career
During his club career, Konopásek won six Czechoslovakian League championships (1965, 1966, 1969, 1970, 1971, and 1972). He also won the European-wide secondary level FIBA Saporta Cup championship, in the 1968–69 season.

National team career
With the senior Czechoslovakian national team, Konopásek competed in the men's tournament at the 1972 Summer Olympics and the 1976 Summer Olympics. With Czechosloavkia, he also won bronze medals at the 1969 EuroBasket, and the 1977 EuroBasket.

References

External links
 

1946 births
Living people
Basketball players at the 1972 Summer Olympics
Basketball players at the 1976 Summer Olympics
Czech basketball coaches
Czech men's basketball players
Olympic basketball players of Czechoslovakia
Point guards
Sportspeople from Prague
Czechoslovak men's basketball players
1970 FIBA World Championship players